Eastern Christian monasticism developed for around a century and a half as a spontaneous religious movement, up to the time of the Council of Chalcedon, which took place in 451. At that Council, since monasticism had become an acknowledged part of the life of the Christian Church, it was specially legislated for.

Origins

Egypt was the Motherland of Christian monasticism; it sprang into existence there at the beginning of the fourth century. The first chapter in its history of monasticism is the life of St. Anthony; the start of the monastic movement may be dated either about 285, when St. Anthony, no longer content with the life of the ordinary ascetic, went into the wilderness, or about 305, when he organized a kind of monastic life for his disciples.

Voluntary poverty, in the complete renunciation of all worldly possessions, would be difficult till there were monasteries; the examples of Origen, Cyprian, and Pamphilus were necessary to show that a monastic life was possible. A full practice of the third Evangelical counsel of obedience could only be realized after the monastic ideal had taken root and passed beyond the purely eremitical stage.

In ante-Nicene ascetics a man would lead a single life, practice long and frequent fasts, abstain from meat and wine, and support himself, if he were able, by some small handicraft, keeping of what he earned only so much as was absolutely necessary for his own sustenance, and giving the rest to the poor. If he were an educated man, he might be employed by the Church in the capacity of catechist. Very often he would don the kind of dress which marked the wearer as a philosopher of an austere school.

In Egypt, at the time when St. Anthony first embraced the ascetic life, there were a number of ascetics living in huts near towns and villages. When St. Anthony died (356 or 357), two types of monasticism flourished in Egypt. There were villages or colonies of hermits – the eremitical type; and monasteries in which a community life was led – the cenobitic type.

The hermit life
The monasticism established under St Anthony's direct influence became the norm in Northern Egypt. In contrast to the fully coenobitical system, established by Pachomius in the South, it continued to be of a semi-eremitical character, the monks living commonly in separate cells or huts, and coming together only occasionally for church services; and the life they lived was not a community life according to rule. This was the form of monastic life in the deserts of Nitria and Scete, as portrayed by Palladius and Cassian. Such groups of semi-independent hermitages were later on called Lauras.

A brief survey of the opening chapters of Palladius's Lausiac History will serve as a description of the former type.

Palladius was a monk from Palestine who, in 388, went to Egypt. On landing at Alexandria he put himself in the hands of a priest named Isidore, who in early life had been a hermit at Nitria and now apparently presided over a hospice at Alexandria without in any way abating the austerity of his life. By the advice of Isidore, Palladius placed himself under the direction of a hermit named Dorotheus who lived six miles outside Alexandria, with whom he was to pass three years learning to subdue his passions and then to return to Isidore to receive higher spiritual knowledge. This Dorotheus spent the whole day collecting stones to build cells for other hermits, and the whole night weaving ropes out of palm leaves. He never lay down to sleep, though slumber sometimes overtook him while working or eating. Palladius who seems to have lived in his cell, ascertained from other solitaries that this had been his custom from his youth upwards. Palladius' health broke down before he completed his time with Dorotheus, but he spent three years in Alexandria and its neighbourhood visiting the hermitages and becoming acquainted with about 2000 monks. From Alexandria he went to Nitria, where there was a monastic village containing about 5000 solitaries. There was no kind of monastic rule. Some of the solitaries lived alone, sometimes two or more lived together. They assembled at the church on Saturdays and Sundays. The church was served by eight priests of whom the oldest always celebrated, preached, and judged, the others only assisting. All worked at weaving flax. There were bakeries where bread was made, not only for the village itself, but for the solitaries who lived in the desert beyond. There were doctors. Wine also was sold.

Strangers were entertained in a guest-house. If able to read, they were lent a book. They might stay as long as they liked, but after a week they were set to some kind of work. But, though there was no monastic rule at Nitria, there was municipal law, the outward symbol of which was three whips suspended from three palm trees, one for monks who might be guilty of some fault, one for thieves who might be caught prowling about, and the third for strangers who misbehaved. Further into the desert was a place called "The Cells", or Cellia, whither the more perfect withdrew. This is described by the author of the "Historia monachorum in Aegypto". Here the solitaries lived in cells so far apart that they were out of sight and out of hearing from one another. Like those of Nitria, they met only on Saturdays and Sundays at church, whither some of them had to travel a distance of three or four miles. Often their death was only discovered by their absence from church.

The collective life

In strong contrast with the individualism of the eremitical life was the rigid discipline which prevailed in the cenobitical monasteries founded by St. Pachomius. When, in 313, Constantine I was at war with Maxentius, Pachomius, still a heathen, was forcibly enlisted together with a number of other young men, and placed on board a ship to be carried down the Nile to Alexandria. At some town at which the ship touched, the recruits were overwhelmed with the kindness of the Christians. Pachomius at once resolved to be a Christian and carried out his resolution as soon as he was dismissed from military service. He began as an ascetic in a small village, taking up his abode in a deserted temple of Serapis and cultivating a garden on the produce of which he lived and gave alms. The fact that Pachomius made an old temple of Serapis his abode was enough for an ingenious theory that he was originally a pagan monk. This view is now quite exploded.

Pachomius next embraced the eremitical life and prevailed upon an old hermit named Palemon to take him as his disciple and share his cell with him. It may be noted that this kind of discipleship, which, as we have already seen, was attempted by Palladius, was a recognized thing among the Egyptian hermits. Afterwards he left Palemon and founded his first monastery at Tabennisi near Denderah. Before he died, in 346, he had under him eight or nine large monasteries of men, and two of women. From a secular point of view, a Pachomian monastery was an industrial community in which almost every kind of trade was practised. This, of course, involved much buying and selling, so the monks had ships of their own on the Nile, which conveyed their agricultural produce and manufactured goods to the market and brought back what the monasteries required. From the spiritual point of view, the Pachomian monk was a religious living under a rule more severe, even when allowance has been made for differences of climate, than that of the Trappists.

A Pachomian monastery was a collection of buildings surrounded by a wall. The monks were distributed in houses, each house containing about forty monks. Three or four houses constituted a tribe. There would be thirty to forty houses in a monastery. There was an abbot over each monastery, and provosts with subordinate officials over each house. The monks were divided into houses according to the work they were employed in: thus there would be a house for carpenters, a house for agriculturists, and so forth. But other principles of division sem to have been employed, e.g., we hear of a house for the Greeks. On Saturdays and Sundays all the monks assembled in the church for Mass; on other days the Office and other spiritual exercises were celebrated in the houses.

"The fundamental idea of St. Pachomius' rule", writes Abbot Edward Joseph Aloysius Butler, "was to establish a moderate level of observance (moderate in comparison with the life led by the hermits) which might be obligatory on all; and then to leave it open to each - and to indeed encourage each - to go beyond the fixed minimum, according as he was prompted by his strength, his courage, and his zeal". This is strikingly illustrated in the rules concerning food. According to St. Jerome, in the preface to his translation of the "Rule of Pachomius", the tables were laid twice a day except on Wednesdays and Fridays, which, outside the seasons of Easter and Pentecost were fast days. Some only took very little at the second meal; some at one or other of the meals confined themselves to a single food; others took just a morsel of bread. Some abstained altogether from the community meal; for these bread, water, and salt were placed in their cell.

Pachomius appointed his successor a monk named Petronius, who died within a few months, having likewise named his successor, Horsiesi. In Horsiesi's time the order was threatened with a schism. The abbot of one of the houses, instead of forwarding the produce of the work of his monks to the head house of the order, where it would be sold and the price distributed to the different houses according to their need, wished to have the disposal of it for the sole benefit of his own monastery. Horsiesi, finding himself unable to cope with the situation, appointed Theodore, a favourite disciple of Pachomius, his coadjutor.

When Theodore died, in the year 368, Horsiesi was able to resume the government of the order. This threatened schism brings prominently before us a feature connected with Pachomius' foundation which is never again met with in the East, and in the West only many centuries later. "Like Cîteaux in a later age", writes Abbot Butler, "it almost at once assumed the shape of a fully organized congregation or order, with a superior general and a system of visitation and general chapters - in short, all the machinery of a centralized government, such as does not appear again in the monastic world until the Cistercian and the Mendicant Orders arose in the twelfth and thirteenth centuries" (op. cit., I,235).

Shenoute

A word must be said about Shenoute (alternative: Shenouda, Schenoudi, Schnoudi, or Senuti). Shortly after the middle of the fourth century, two monks, Pigol and Pishoy, changed their eremitical monasteries into cenobitical ones. Of the latter we know scarcely anything. Shenoute, when a boy of about nine years old came under the care of his uncle Pigol. Both Pigol and Shenoute were reformers – the Pachomian Rule was not strict enough for them.

Shenoute succeeded his uncle Pigol as head of the White Monastery of Athribis, and, till his death (about 453), was not only the greatest monastic leader, but one of the most important men, in Egypt. He waged war against heretics; he took a prominent part in the rooting out of paganism; he championed the cause of the poor against the rich. He once went in person to Constantinople to complain of the tyranny of government officials. On one occasion 20,000 men, women, and children took refuge in the White Monastery during an invasion of the Blemmyes of Ethiopia, and Shenoute maintained all the fugitives for three months, providing them with food and medical aid. On another occasion he ransomed a hundred captives and sent them home with food, clothing, and money for their journey. Shenoute's importance for the history of monasticism is small, for his influence, great as it was in his own country, did not make itself felt elsewhere. There were two barriers: Upper Egypt was a difficult and dangerous country for travellers, and such as did penetrate there would not be likely to visit a monastery where hardly anything but Coptic was spoken. According to Abbot Butler, "Schenoudi is never named by any Greek or Latin writer" (op. cit., II,204). He has been rediscovered in our own time in Coptic manuscripts.

Spread
With the exception of a single Pachomian monastery at Canopus, near Alexandria, the cenobitic monasteries were in the South, and confined to a relatively small area. The eremitical monasteries, on the contrary, are everywhere, and especially in the North. These latter were thus far more accessible to pilgrims visiting Egypt and so became the patterns or models for the rest of the Christian world. It was the eremitical, not the cenobitical, type of monasticism which went forth from Egypt.

Monasticism at a very early date spread eastwards. The solitaries had a special predilection for Scriptural sites. At every place hallowed by tradition, which Syria visited (A.D.385), she found monks. The attraction of Mount Sinai for the solitaries was irresistible, in spite of the danger of captivity or death at the hands of the Saracens. In 373 a number of solitaries inhabited this mountain, living on dates and other fruit, such bread as they had been reserved for the Sacred Mysteries. All the week they lived apart in their cells; they gathered together in the church on Saturday evening and, after spending the night in prayer, received communion on Sunday morning. Forty of them were massacred in 373, and on the same day another group of solitaries at Raithe (supposed to be Elim) were killed by a second band of barbarians. These events were described by eyewitnesses (Tillemont, "H.E.", VII, 573-80). The same kind of life was being led at Mount Sinai, and a similar experience was undergone some twenty years later when St. Nilus was there.

St. Hilarion, who for a time had been a disciple of St. Anthony, propagated monasticism of the eremitical type first in the neighbourhood of his native city Gaza and then in Cyprus. His friend, St. Epiphanius, after practising the monastic life in Egypt, founded a monastery near Eleutheropolis in Palestine somewhere about 330 or perhaps a little later.

In Jerusalem and its neighbourhood there were numerous monasteries at a very early date. There was the monastery on the Mount of Olives, from which Palladius went forth on his tour of the Egyptian monasteries; there were two monasteries for women in Jerusalem, built by the older and younger Melania respectively. At Bethlehem, St. Paula founded three monasteries for women and one for men about 387. There was, besides, in Bethlehem the monastery where Cassian some years before began his religious life. The Lauras, which were very numerous, formed a conspicuous feature in Palestinian monasticism. The first seems to have been founded before 334 by St. Chariton at Pharan, a few miles from Jerusalem; later on two more were founded by the same saint at Jericho and at Suca.

St. Euthymius (473) founded another celebrated one in the Kidron Valley. Near Jericho was the laura ruled over by St. Gerasimus (475). Some details concerning the rules of this laura have been preserved in a very ancient Life of St. Euthymius. It consisted of a cenobium where the cenobitic life was practised by novices and others less proficient. There were also seventy cells for solitaries. Five days in the week these latter lived and worked alone in their cells. On Saturday they brought their work to the cenobium, where, after receiving Holy Communion on Sundays, they partook of some cooked food and a little wine. The rest of the week their fare was bread, dates and water. When some of them asked to be allowed to heat some water, that they might cook some food and to have a lamp to read by, they were told that if they wished to live thus they had better take up their abode in the cenobium (Acta Sanctorum., March 1, 386,87).

Antioch

Antioch, when John Chrysostom was a young man, was full of ascetics and the neighbouring mountains were peopled with hermits. So great was the impulse driving men to the solitary life that at one time there was an outcry, amounting almost to a persecution, among Christians as well as pagans against those who embraced it. This was the occasion of Chrysostom's treatise against the opponents of monasticism: in the first book he dwelt upon the guilt incurred by them; the second and third were addressed respectively to a pagan and a Christian father who were opposing the wish of their sons to embrace the monastic state. He yielded to his mother's wishes and lived the ascetic life at home until her death; a scene between Chrysostom and his mother is at the beginning of the "De Sacertio". Palestine and Antioch are examples of the rapid spread of monasticism outside of Egypt. There is abundant evidence of the phenomenon in all the countries between the Mediterranean and Mesopotamia; and Mesopotamia, according to St Jerome, whose testimony is amply borne out by other writers, rivalled Egypt itself in the number and holiness of its monks (Comm. in Isaiam, V,xix).

Basil

Basil the Great before embracing the monastic state made a careful study of monasticism in Egypt, Palestine, Coelesyria, and Mesopotamia. The result was a decided preference for the cenobitic life. He founded several monasteries in Pontus, over one of which he himself for a time presided, and very soon monasteries, modelled after his, spread over the East.

His monks assembled together for "psalmody" and "genuflexions" seven times a day, in accordance with the Psalmist's "Septies in die laudem dixi tibi" (Ps. cxviii,164): at midnight ("Media nocte surgebam" - Ibid.,62), at evening, morning and midday (Ps. lv,18), at the third hour, the hour of Pentecost, and at the ninth, the sacred hour of the Passion. To complete the tale of seven, the midday prayer was divided into two parts separated by the community meal (Sermo "Asceticus", Benedictine edition, II,321).

Basil's monastic ideal is set forth in a collection of his writings known as the "Asceticon", or "Ascetica", the most important of which are the "Regulae fusius tractatae", a series of answers to questions, fifty-five in number, and the "Regulae brevius tractatae", in which three hundred and thirteen questions are briefly replied to. It must not be supposed that the "Regulae" form a rule, though it would be possible to go a good way towards constituting one out of them. They are answers to questions which would naturally arise among persons already in possession of a framework of customs or traditions. Sometimes they treat of practical questions, but as often as not they deal with matters concerning the spiritual life.

Basil did not draw up a rule, but gave a model or pattern; and was not the founder of a religious order. No Eastern, except Pachomius, ever was. An order, as we understand the term, is a purely Western Christian product. "It is not enough", says a writer who certainly does not underrate Basil's influence, "to affirm that the Basilian Order is a myth. One must go farther and give up calling the Byzantine monks Basilians. Those most concerned have never taken this title, and no Eastern writer that I know of has ever bestowed it upon them" (Pargoire in "Dict. d'Archeologie chretienne", s.v. "Basile"). In a word, every monastery is an order of its own. With Basil Eastern monasticism reached its final stage – communities of monks leading the contemplative life and devoting themselves wholly to prayer and work. The cenobitical life steadily became the normal form of the religious calling, and the eremitical one the exceptional form, requiring a long previous training.

We must now speak of the grounds upon which St. Basil based his decision – a decision so momentous for the future history of monasticism – in favour of the cenobitical life. Life with others is more expedient because, in the first place, even for the supply of their bodily needs, men depend upon one another. Further, there is the law of charity. The solitary has only himself to regard; yet, "charity seeks not itself".

Again, the solitary will not equally discover his faults, there being no one to correct him with meekness and mercy. There are precepts of charity which can only be fulfilled in the cenobitical life. The gifts of the Holy Spirit are not all given to all men, but one is given to one man and another to another. We cannot be partakers in the gifts not bestowed on ourselves if we live by ourselves. The great danger to the solitary is self-complacency; he is not put to the test, so that he is unable to learn his faults or his progress. How can he learn humility when there is no one to prefer before himself? Or patience when there is no one to yield to? Whose feet shall he wash? To whom shall he be as a servant? (Reg.fus. tract., Q.vii.) This condemnation of the eremitical life is interesting because of what might almost be called its tameness. One would expect at least a lurid picture of the dangers which the solitary ran, delusions, melancholy culminating in despair, terrible moral and spiritual falls, the abandonment of the religious calling for the life of vice, and so forth. But instead of such things we have little more than what amounts to disadvantages and the risk of somewhat flat and commonplace kinds of failure, against which the common life afforded the best protection. Clearly St. Basil found little that was tragic during the two years he was investigating monasticism in Egypt, Mesopotamia, and elsewhere.

It might be supposed that so uncompromising a verdict against the eremitical life would stir up a fierce conflict. As a matter of fact, it did nothing of the kind.

Later developments

Palestine, at the end of the fourth century, began to supersede Egypt as the centre of monasticism, and in Palestine the laura and the cenobium were in perfect harmony. That of St. Gerasimus, with its cenobium already referred to, may be taken as a typical example. St. Basil's authority was equal to St. Anthony's among the leaders of Palestinian monasticism; yet they took it as a matter of course that life in the laura was the most perfect, though under ordinary circumstances it should not be entered upon before an apprenticeship had been served in a cenobium. The dweller in the laura was under an archimandrite or abbot.

By the time of Chalcedon, it was agreed that monasteries were not to be erected without the leave of the bishop; monks were to receive due honour, but were not to mix themselves up with the affairs of Church or State. They were to be subject to the bishop, etc. (can.iv). Clerics and monks were not to serve in war or embrace a secular life (can.vii). Monasteries were not to be secularized (can.xxiv).

Solitary spots, according to Basil, should be chosen as sites for monasteries. Nevertheless, they soon found their way into cities. According to one scholar, at least fifteen monasteries were founded at Constantinople in the time of Constantine the Great; but others affirm that the three most ancient ones only dated back to the time of Theodosius (375-95). In 518 there were at least fifty-four monasteries in Constantinople. Their names and those of their rulers are given in a petition addressed by the monks of Constantinople to Pope Hormisdas in 518.

See also 
 Coptic monasticism
 clasau, the early Welsh monasteries
 Members of the covenant
 Sinaites in Serbia
 Chronology of early Christian monasticism

References

Ancient Christianity
Christian monasticism